The United States Revenue Act of 1924 (June 2, 1924), also known as the Mellon tax bill (after U.S. Secretary of the Treasury Andrew Mellon) cut federal tax rates for 1924 income. The bottom rate, on income under $4,000, fell from 1.5% to 1.125% (both rates are after reduction by the "earned income credit").

The Act also:
 Established the U.S. Board of Tax Appeals, which was later renamed the United States Tax Court in 1942.
 Gave the chair of the House Ways and Means Committee the power to obtain the records for any taxpayer, in response to the Teapot Dome scandal.
 Declared that there were no longer any "Indians, not taxed" to be not counted for purposes of United States congressional apportionment. A parallel act, the Indian Citizenship Act of 1924 (Ch. 233 (1924)), granted all non-citizen resident Indians citizenship. 

President Calvin Coolidge signed the bill into law.

From 2019 to 2022, the law was the subject of a court battle that resulted in the Ways and Means Committee obtaining the tax returns of Donald Trump.

Tax levels
Both a normal tax and a surtax were levied against the net income of individuals, as shown in the following table:

Exemption of $1,000 for single filers and $2,500 for married couples and heads of family. A $400 exemption for each dependent under 18.

References 

United States federal taxation legislation
1924 in American law
1924 in the United States
68th United States Congress
Presidency of Calvin Coolidge